Albiez-Montrond is a commune in the Savoie department in the Auvergne-Rhône-Alpes region in south-eastern France.

Geography

Climate

Albiez-Montrond has a humid continental climate (Köppen climate classification Dfb).

Population

See also
Communes of the Savoie department

References

Communes of Savoie